In United Nations Security Council resolution 661, adopted on 6 August 1990, reaffirming Resolution 660 (1990) and noting Iraq's refusal to comply with it and Kuwait's right of self-defence, the Council took steps to implement international sanctions on Iraq under Chapter VII of the United Nations Charter. This was the second resolution by the Security Council over the invasion of Kuwait.

The Council therefore decided that states should prevent:

(a) the import of all products and commodities originating in Iraq or Kuwait;
(b) any activities by their nationals or in their territories that would promote the export of products originating in Iraq or Kuwait, as well as the transfer of funds to either country for the purposes of such activities;
(c) the sale of weapons or other military equipment to Iraq and Kuwait, excluding humanitarian aid;
(d) the availability of funds or other financial or economic resources to either country, or to any commercial, industrial or public utility operating within them, except for medical or humanitarian purposes.

Resolution 661 called on all member states, including non-members of the United Nations, to act strictly in accordance with the resolution, and decided to establish a Committee of the Security Council consisting of all members of the council, to examine reports by the Secretary-General Javier Pérez de Cuéllar on the situation and seek information from states on the action they are taking to implement Resolution 661, requesting they all co-operate with the committee.

Finally, the Council stressed that the sanctions regime imposed should not affect assistance given to the legitimate Government of Kuwait. The resolution was adopted by 13 votes to none, while Cuba and Yemen abstained from voting.

After the end of the Gulf War and the Iraqi withdrawal from Kuwait, the sanctions were linked to removal of weapons of mass destruction by Resolution 687 (1991). The effects of government policy and the sanctions regime led to hyperinflation, widespread poverty and malnutrition.

The 661 Committee
The committee established under the resolution became commonly known as the 661 Committee, or alternatively as the Iraq Sanctions Committee.
Although the initial mandate of the 661 Committee was quite modest, it took on broad responsibilities in the implementation of the sanctions. Joy Gordon, a scholar on the Iraq sanctions wrote:

The 661 Committee determined what goods Iraq could import as humanitarian exemptions, responded to allegations of smuggling, determined what goods the UN agencies engaged in humanitarian work could bring into Iraq, addressed issues involving the no-fly zones, and took upon itself the task of interpreting Security Council resolutions regarding Iraq.

Before the Oil-for-Food Programme commenced in 1996, exemptions from the sanctions regime granted by the 661 Committee was the sole legal means for Iraq to import any goods.

See also
 Foreign relations of Iraq
 Gulf War
 Invasion of Kuwait
 Iraq–Kuwait relations
 Iraq sanctions
 List of United Nations Security Council Resolutions 601 to 700 (1987–1991)

References

External links
 
Text of the Resolution at undocs.org

 0661
 0661
Gulf War
1990 in Kuwait
1990 in Iraq
United Nations Security Council sanctions regimes
 0661
August 1990 events
Sanctions against Iraq